The Itawes, Itawis, Hitawit or Itawit (endonym) are a group of people living in the Philippines. Their name is derived from the Itawes prefix i- meaning "people of" and tawid or "across the river".

The Itawes are among the earliest inhabitants of the Cagayan Valley in northern Luzon. Other than their mother tongue (categorized as closely related to Gaddang), they speak Ibanag and Ilocano. They are not very different from other lowland Christianized Filipino ethnic groups in terms of livelihood, housing, and traditions. Their traditional dresses are colorful with red being the dominant color. Farming is a leading source of livelihood. The average families are education-conscious.

References

External links
https://web.archive.org/web/20150925124013/http://litera1no4.tripod.com/itawes_frame.html

Ethnic groups in the Philippines
Ethnic groups in Luzon